We Are the People may refer to:

 "We Are the People" (Empire of the Sun song), 2008
 "We Are the People" (Feeder song), 2008
 "We Are the People" (Martin Garrix song), 2021, featuring Bono and the Edge
 We Are the People Party, an Egyptian political party

See also
  (We are the people!)
 We the People (disambiguation)
 We Are the People We've Been Waiting For, 2009 documentary film